Eugenio Canfari (16 April 1877 – 23 March 1962) was an early Italian sporting director. He was one of the thirteen men who founded Juventus in 1897 and the club's first ever president. His brother Enrico Canfari was also a founding member of Juventus, and was the first ever president, though he never played in the Italian Football Championship with Enrico and Juventus.

References

Sources
 

Italian sports directors
Juventus F.C. players
1877 births
1962 deaths
Juventus F.C. chairmen and investors
Italian footballers
Association footballers not categorized by position